Judith Dvorkin (22 April 1928 – 24 July 1995) was an American composer and librettist. She also used the pseudonym Judy Spencer.

Dvorkin was born in New York. She studied music at Barnard College with Otto Luening and at Columbia University with Luening and Elliott Carter. She continued her studies in seminars with Roger Sessions at the University of California at Berkeley.

Works
Dvorkin is known for chamber opera and theater works, but also composes vocal and instrumental works. Selected works include:
Humpty Dumpty, 1988, opera based on Alice's Adventures in Wonderland by Lewis Carroll
Blue Star, 1983, opera
The Capitoline Venus, 1969, opera in one act after an episode in the writings of Mark Twain, libretto by Judith Dvorkin (music by Ulysses Kay)
Marpessa: A Myth, for soprano, clarinet and piano
Cyrano, based on the play by Edmond Rostand, as translated by E.W. Dvorkin ca. 1964
Maurice
Perspectives for flute
Song Cycle for choir
Four Women for choir
The Children for bass, flute, oboe and violin

Her work has been recorded and issued on CD, including:
Maurice, New World Records

References

1928 births
20th-century classical composers
American women classical composers
American classical composers
American opera composers
1995 deaths
American opera librettists
Women opera librettists
Pupils of Otto Luening
Pupils of Elliott Carter
Pupils of Roger Sessions
Barnard College alumni
University of California, Berkeley alumni
20th-century American writers
Writers from New York (state)
20th-century American women writers
Women opera composers
20th-century American women musicians
20th-century American composers
Classical musicians from New York (state)
20th-century women composers